Calvey (also spelled Calvy) is an extinct town in Franklin County, in the U.S. state of Missouri.

A post office Calvy was established in 1854, and remained in operation until 1908. The community most likely took its name from Calvey Township.

References

Ghost towns in Missouri
Former populated places in Franklin County, Missouri